TISCO may refer to:

 Taiyuan Iron and Steel Group, a Chinese steel company
 Tata Iron and Steel Company Limited, an Indian steel company
 Thai Nguyen Iron and Steel Corporation, a Vietnamese (Thái Nguyên) steel company
 Tisco Bank, Thailand